The National Technological University – Paraná Regional Faculty or FRP (CastilianUniversidad Tecnológica Nacional(UTN-FRP)) is one of the universities of the National Technological University (UTN). It is located in Paraná, Argentina, and it offers academic degrees on the following subjects:

 Electronic Engineering
 Civil Engineering
 Electromechanical Engineering

See also
UTN

External links
 

Parana
Engineering universities and colleges in Argentina
Technical universities and colleges in Argentina